Dastouran (also Romanized as Dastoūrān) is a village in Dastouran Rural District, in the Central District of Joghatai County, Razavi Khorasan Province, Iran. At the 2006 census, its population was 1300, in 300 families.

References 

Populated places in Joghatai County